The Trump Victory Committee was a joint fundraising committee for Donald J. Trump for President (the Donald Trump presidential campaign organization), the Republican National Committee (RNC), and 11 state Republican committees.

Overview
The Committee's first fundraising dinners were held on May 24, 2016 in Albuquerque and May 25, 2016 in Los Angeles.

Trump's 2020 reelection campaign merged with the RNC into a single "Trump Victory" entity, sharing office space.  By tying Trump's reelection campaign to the RNC, it unified 2020 Republican Party presidential campaign.

Leadership
The fund is nominally headed by Reince Priebus and led by RNC finance chair Lew Eisenberg and Trump campaign finance chair Steve Mnuchin. Its vice chairs were:
 Elliott Broidy
 Woody Johnson, New York Jets owner 
 Diane Hendricks, chairwoman of ABC Supply Co. 
 Mel Sembler, a shopping mall developer
 Ray Washburne, Dallas-based investor
 Ronald Weiser, former chairman of Michigan Republican Party
 Kimberly Guilfoyle (finance committee), an American political analyst, journalist, attorney, and television news personality who co-hosted The Five on Fox News.

References 

United States political action committees
Donald Trump 2016 presidential campaign
Republican National Committee